Farmi Suomi 2022 (The Farm Finland 2022) is the third season of the Finnish version of The Farm. 15 celebrities travel to a farm in Pieksämäki, Finland where they will live on the farm like it was 100 years prior and complete tasks to maintain the farm whilst trying to be the last farmer standing. The winner of the season will win a grand prize of €30,000. The season is presented for the first time by Susanna Laine with the season premiering on 12 February 2022 on Nelonen.

Finishing order
(age are stated at time of competition)

The game

Notes

References

External links

The Farm (franchise)
Finnish reality television series
2022 Finnish television seasons